Robert William Moncel,  (April 9, 1917 – December 10, 2007) was a Canadian army officer. Moncel was Lieutenant-General of the Canadian Army and former Vice Chief of the Defence Staff. He was the youngest general officer in the Canadian Army when promoted to Brigadier on August 17, 1944, at the age of 27.

Early life
Born in Montreal, Quebec, he was educated at Selwyn House School, Bishop's College School and McGill University. He served as an officer with the Victoria Rifles of Canada.

World War II

When World War II broke out, Moncel went to Europe with the Royal Canadian Regiment (RCR). In May 1940, he was ordered along with the RCR to France to reinforce the British Expeditionary Force facing the German blitzkrieg. Soon however, Lieutenant Moncel, who commanded a Bren gun carrier platoon, was ordered to retreat to the French coast. When being evacuated, he was ordered to destroy his equipment to save it from German hands, but Moncel, with his cool judgement, managed to evacuate the Bren gun carriers. This act caught the eyes of his superiors and he was promoted to captain.

In 1941, he finished first on a staff  course under the command of Guy Simonds, and was promoted to major in 1942, and lieutenant-colonel in January 1943. Moncel became the commanding officer of 18th Armoured Car Regiment (12th Manitoba Dragoons). Later, Moncel was posted as the General Staff Officer 1 of the II Canadian Corps, where he reorganized its general staff. Here, he was made an officer of the Order of the British Empire (OBE) and a chevalier of the Legion d'honneur (receiving the Croix de Guerre with Palme in the process). In August 1944 at the age of 27, he was promoted to Brigadier, the youngest ever Canadian to achieve that rank.

In the Normandy campaign, he was the commanding officer of the 4th Canadian Armoured Brigade until the end of the war in 1945. During this, Moncel won the Distinguished Service Order (DSO) for his leadership of Tiger Group during the battle of Hochwald Forest, when the II Canadian Corps launched Operation Blockbuster.

Post-War
After the war, in 1946, he was appointed Director of the Royal Canadian Armoured Corps. From 1947 to 1949, he served as Director of Military Training, Army Headquarters in Ottawa. From 1949 to 1950, he attended the National War College in Washington, DC. From 1951 to 1953, he was the Senior Canadian Army Liaison Officer to the United Kingdom. From 1954 to 1956, he was the Deputy Chief of General Staff. From 1957 to 1958, he was the Senior Canadian Military Officer, International Control Commission in Indochina. From 1957 to 1960, he was appointed Commander, 3rd Canadian Infantry Brigade at Camp Gagetown. From 1960 to 1963, he served as Quartermaster General of the Canadian Army. From 1963 to 1964, he was the Commander-in-Chief, Eastern Command. He served finally as Vice Chief of the Defence Staff 1965 to 1966. He retired in 1966 prior to unification of the armed services, which resulted in the formation of the Canadian Forces. In 1967, he was appointed a civilian coordinator for visits of heads of state to Canada during the Canadian Centennial year.

In 1967, Lieutenant-General Moncel was invested as an Officer of the Order of Canada. He died at the Camp Hill Veterans' Memorial Building in Halifax, Nova Scotia, on December 10, 2007, in his 90th year.

References

See also 
List of Bishop's College School alumni

External links
Generals of World War II
Successful Command Lieutenant-General Robert Moncel on Wartime Leaders
Art collection becomes a lifeline for a loyal housekeeper - The Globe and Mail: March 20, 2014

1917 births
2007 deaths
Bishop's University alumni
Canadian Companions of the Distinguished Service Order
McGill University alumni
Officers of the Order of Canada
Canadian Officers of the Order of the British Empire
Bishop's College School alumni
Military personnel from Montreal
Vice Chiefs of the Defence Staff (Canada)
Canadian Army personnel of World War II
Canadian generals
National War College alumni
Canadian Militia officers
Royal Canadian Regiment officers
12th Manitoba Dragoons
Victoria Rifles of Canada